Helal Hafiz (born 7 October 1948) is a Bangladeshi poet.  He is considered a true representative of poets of his generation having certain creative traits in an age when his nation and countries in the neighbourhood witnessed dramatic transitions particularly in the arena of politics.  He won Bangla Academy Literary Award (2013).

Early life, education and career
On completion of his schooling and college studies at his hometown in northern Netrokona, Hafiz got himself enrolled at the University of Dhaka, at a time when it appeared as main centre of the brewing nationalist movement which eventually saw the 1971 emergence of independent Bangladesh. He is considered a true representative of the poets of his generation. He studied at Netrokona Datta High School, Netrokona College and University of Dhaka. Hafiz earned the repute of being an established poet of verve, vigour and emptiness long ahead of the publication of his first collection of poems: Je Jale Agun Jwale (The water where fire is ignited) in 1986. It earned the best sellers status in Ekushey Book Fair of the year, discarding novels by popular writers who traditionally occupy the position in Bangladesh's biggest annual book fair. "Nishiddha Sampadakiya" (The Banned Editorial), one of his most quoted poems inspired at least two generations since the pre-independence nationalist upsurge of 1969 and pro-democracy campaigns in post independence periods.

Poetry

Hafiz never associated himself directly with any political activity but his famous verses “Ekhon joubon jar juddhe jabar tar shreshtha samoy” (It's the best time for one to go to war who is in his youth) was seen in wall writings, posters, leaflets and chanted in processions at university campuses and street side walls to inspire the youths to get prepared for the Liberation War against Pakistan. It returned as a popular slogan of student activists and left-leaning organisations during popular movements against military or autocratic rules in independent Bangladesh. But Hafiz, who appeared to be a sensitive man on questions of quality, visibly preferred a self-exile from the literary arena for years after the publication of the Je Jale Agun Jwale. He explained his silence as the outcome of a sense of fright of losing popularity after the tremendous success that reached him to the peak of fame. Hafiz, however, gradually resumed his literary activities recently coming up with his Kabita Ekattur (Poems Seventy One) recently to make visible again his formidable presence in the literary arena while his third book is set to hit the bookstalls in few months.

A journalist by profession Hafiz eventually found the literature section of newspapers as his professional abode while he served as a literary editor of a number of newspapers over the past four decades. But the instability in the newspaper industry also threw him out of the job several times, exposing him to extreme difficulties. His luck in gambling earned him the repute of being a great gambler in close circle and in one of his newspaper interviews Hafiz bluntly said during his state of joblessness, gambling appeared to be his major income source for a period.

A dichotomy of love of land and devotion to the lover is clearly visible in his poems but Hafiz finds a way toward a compromise projecting himself as a tender lover and rebel patriot as he wrote “Rather today let us like the songs of Jahidur/Summon boshekh from the heart, bring in both lives /Do you know, Helen.

References

Living people
1948 births
People from Netrokona District
Bangladeshi male poets
Recipients of Bangla Academy Award